The 2020 Supercopa de España de Baloncesto, also known as Supercopa Endesa for sponsorship reasons, was the 17th edition of the Supercopa de España de Baloncesto, an annual basketball competition for clubs in the Spanish basketball league system that were successful in its major competitions in the preceding season. All matches were played behind closed doors due to the COVID-19 pandemic.

Real Madrid defended successfully the title and conquered its third consecutive Supercup, 7th overall.

All times were in Western European Summer Time (UTC+01:00).

Qualification 
The tournament featured the winners from the three major competitions (2019–20 Liga Endesa, 2020 Copa del Rey and 2019 Supercopa Endesa), the host team and the remaining highest ranked teams from the 2019–20 Liga Endesa season if vacant berths exist.

Qualified teams 
The following four teams qualified for the tournament.

Venue 
On May 16, 2019, ACB selected and announced Tenerife to host the supercup on September 2020. The venue can hold 5,000 people for basketball games, and it offers 2,000 square meters of floor space. The facilities remain open all year long, without interruption. The pavilion also provides the following facilities for athletic use: 5 large locker rooms and 4 double locker rooms. Additionally, a gymnasium, infirmary, video and press room are available as well as a rehab room for athletes. The arena hosted the 2017 Champions League Final Four, as Iberostar Tenerife hosted the tournament in which Tenerife won its first Champions League title. The arena also hosted the 2017 Intercontinental Cup final match between Tenerife and Guaros de Lara. The arena was also used a host venue of the 2018 Women's World Cup, and the 2020 Intercontinental Cup.

Draw 
The draw was held on 29 July 2020 in Tenerife, Spain. TD Systems Baskonia as the league champion and Real Madrid as cup champion were the seeded teams.

Bracket

Semifinals

TD Systems Baskonia vs. Barça

Iberostar Tenerife vs. Real Madrid

Final

References

External links 
 Official website 

Supercopa de España de Baloncesto
2020–21 in Spanish basketball
September 2020 sports events in Spain
Impact of the COVID-19 pandemic on basketball